The blackfin flounder (Glyptocephalus stelleri) is a flatfish of the family Pleuronectidae. Its native habitat is the northern Pacific, from the Sea of Japan to the Strait of Tartary and southern Kuril Islands and out into the Bering Sea. Maximum reported lifespan is 23 years.

Diet

The blackfin flounder's diet consists of benthos invertebrates such as crustaceans, molluscs and worms.

Atavism

In 2005 a blackfin flounder was caught in Peter the Great Gulf, Russia that had its eyes on the left hand side of its body and corresponding reversal of pigmentation (see Bothidae). This is the first recorded instance of this form of atavism in the blackfin flounder.

References

blackfin flounder
Fish of Japan
Kuril Islands
Fish of the Bering Sea
blackfin flounder